Chakla may refer to:

 Chakla, an Indian kitchen utensil
 Chakla, name for brothel or bordello in the Indian-subcontinent 
 Chakla (administrative division), such as the Kingdom of Chakla 
 Chakla, an irrigated land revenue assessment circle in the Indian-subcontinent

See also 

 Chak (disambiguation)
 Chakra (disambiguation)
Charla (name)